Tibial vein may refer to:

 Anterior tibial vein
 Posterior tibial vein